Ayoub Ghadfa is a Spanish boxer. He participated at the 2022 European Amateur Boxing Championships, being awarded the bronze medal in the super heavyweight event. Ghadfa also participated at the 2021 AIBA World Boxing Championships in the super heavyweight event, winning no medal.

References

External links 

Living people
Place of birth missing (living people)
Year of birth missing (living people)
Spanish male boxers
Super-heavyweight boxers
21st-century Spanish people